Dorsa Cato is a wrinkle ridge at  on the Moon. It is approximately 130 km long and was named after the ancient Roman senator and historian Cato the Elder in 1976 by the IAU.

The dorsa are located north of the prominent Messier crater in Mare Fecunditatis.

References

Cato